Infundibulicybe gibba (also known as Clitocybe gibba) is a species of gilled mushroom which is common in European woods.  In English it is sometimes known as the  common funnel.

Naming
This species was originally described by the mycologist Christiaan Hendrik Persoon in 1801 as Agaricus gibbus, at a time when gilled mushrooms were generally all assigned to genus Agaricus.  Then in 1871 in his guide to mycology ("Der Führer in die Pilzkunde"),  Paul Kummer allocated the species to the genus Clitocybe, which previously (according to the system of Fries) had only been a tribe within genus Agaricus.

In 2003 Harri Harmaja created the new genus Infundibulicybe for some of the larger members of the former Clitocybe and he included Infundibulicybe gibba as the type species.  A couple of authorities still keep it in genus Clitocybe, however.

The older name Clitocybe infundibuliformis is often identified as a synonym of I. gibba, but according to Species Fungorum that use was incorrect and the original C. infundibuliformis was a different mushroom.

The epithet gibba comes from the Latin adjective "gibbus", meaning "humped" or "gibbous".  The name infundibuliformis derives from the Latin "infundibulum", a funnel, with the suffix "-formis" - so it means "funnel-shaped".

Description
This section uses the given references throughout.

The matt slightly felted cap grows from about 3 cm to 9 cm, and is beige to tan, also sometimes with a pink tinge. It soon becomes funnel-shaped but often has a small bulge (an "umbo") in the centre.
There is no ring or other veil remnant. The stem is white or whitish and about 2–8 cm long and 1 cm in diameter.
The white gills are crowded and very decurrent (running down the stem).
It has a faint "cyanic" smell, like new-mown hay, and the taste is mild.  However, there is also a central European variety "adstringens" which has an unpleasant taste.
The tear-shaped spores are white and around 5.5–8 µm by 4–5 µm.

Distribution, habitat, ecology and human impact
This gregarious saprobic mushroom grows on soil in deciduous or (less commonly) coniferous woods and may be found from summer to autumn.  It sometimes forms fairy rings.

It is very common throughout Europe, and occurs in North America and Japan.

It is edible when young, but said to be of mediocre quality. It can be fried or used in risottos or soups etc. The stems are tough and may be discarded. The species resembles some which are poisonous.

An extract of I. gibba exhibits inhibitory activity on thrombin.

Similar species
The species resembles Infundibulicybe squamulosa and Pseudoclitocybe cyathiformis.

References

Tricholomataceae
Edible fungi
Fungi described in 1801
Fungi of Europe
Taxa named by Christiaan Hendrik Persoon